Khorusi-ye Shomali (also Romanized as Khorūsī-ye Shomālī; also known as Khorūs-e Shomālī) is a village in Naseri Rural District, Khanafereh District, Shadegan County, Khuzestan Province, Iran. At the 2006 census, its population was 1,193, in 217 families.

References 

Populated places in Shadegan County